Bell Salem is the second EP by the band 12012, released on October 10, 2004, being the first release of a three-month release campaign.

Track listing 
 "Burn" - 5:41
 "Ame -Sogi Otosareta Kankaku" - 4:27
 "Ms Vampire" - 4:42
 "Epi" - 1:19
 "Un Insomnia" - 4:53

Personnel 

 Wataru Miyawaki – lead vocals
 Hiroaki Sakai – guitar
 Yūsuke Suga – guitar
 Tomoyuki Enya – bass
 Tōru Kawauchi – drums

Notes
Bell Salem (ベルサレム) was reissued in 2006, along with Knight Mare and Shin -Deep-
Only 3000 copies of the album were pressed.

12012 albums
2004 EPs